Dame Catherine Leslie Wingate DBE (née Rundle; 26 October 1858 – 10 June 1946) was a British humanitarian.

The daughter of Royal Navy Captain Joseph Rundle and his wife, Renira Catherine (née Leslie), her brother was General Sir Leslie Rundle. On 18 June 1888, she married Reginald Wingate, a Royal Artillery officer. They had three children: Ronald Evelyn Leslie Wingate (born 30 September 1889), Malcolm Roy Wingate (born 28 August 1893), and Victoria Alexandrina Catherine Wingate (born 1899). General Sir Reginald Wingate was Governor-General of the Sudan and Sirdar of the Egyptian Army from 1899 and 1916 and High Commissioner of Egypt from 1917 to 1919.

During the First World War Lady Wingate was president of the Cairo and Alexandria Red Cross Committee and of the Empire Nurses' Red Cross Clubs in the two cities, and for these services she was appointed Dame Commander of the Order of the British Empire (DBE) in the 1920 civilian war honours.

References

Sources
Obituary, The Times, 11 June 1946
Biography of Sir Reginald Wingate, Oxford Dictionary of National Biography

1858 births
1946 deaths
British humanitarians
Dames Commander of the Order of the British Empire
British women in World War I
Place of birth missing
Place of death missing